David Kidwell (born 23 April 1977) is a professional rugby coach who is the defence coach at Los Pumas, the national rugby union team of Argentina, and a former rugby league player. As a player, he represented New Zealand as a member of the 2005 Tri-Nations and 2008 World Cup winning New Zealand teams.

Background
Kidwell was born in Christchurch, New Zealand.

Playing career
A Hornby Panthers junior in the Canterbury Rugby League competition, in 1995 Kidwell played in the Lion Red Cup for the Canterbury Country Cardinals.

He then joined the Canterbury Bankstown Bulldogs in 1996 and also made the 1996 Junior Kiwis that year. He made his First Grade début on 17 August 1997 in Round 17 for the Adelaide Rams against Canberra at Canberra Stadium. Kidwell was selected for the New Zealand team to compete in the end of season 1999 Rugby League Tri-Nations tournament. In the final against Australia he played from the interchange bench in the Kiwis' 22–20 loss.

In 2006 Kidwell signed a pre-contract agreement to represent the South Sydney Rabbitohs until 2009. He later played in Melbourne's 2006 NRL Grand Final loss to Brisbane. Kidwell has previously played for the Melbourne Storm, Sydney Roosters, Warrington Wolves, Parramatta Eels and the Adelaide Rams.

In the 2007 pre-season, it was announced that Kidwell would be co-captain of the South Sydney Rabbitohs, along with Peter Cusack for 2007.  In April 2007, Kidwell was ruled out for the season after suffering a freak accident at home where he tripped over one of his children and injured his knee. After failing an alcohol test on 2 May 2008, the Rabbitohs stripped Kidwell of his co-captaincy and four others who failed were relegated to the bench for their Sunday match against the Cowboys.

At the end of 2007 Kidwell was named in the Melbourne Storm team of the decade.

Kidwell retired from rugby league at the end of the 2009 season.

Representative career
Kidwell made his New Zealand début in 1999.

In August 2008, Kidwell was named in the New Zealand training squad for the 2008 Rugby League World Cup, and in October 2008, he was named in the final 24-man Kiwi squad.

Coaching career
Kidwell was appointed the Rabbitohs Toyota Cup (Under 20s competition) coach for 2010.
They finished minor premiers that year and made the Grand Final, but were defeated 42-28 by the Under 20s New Zealand Warriors. He later worked as an assistant coach at the Melbourne Storm under Craig Bellamy. On 16 September 2013 it was announced that he would be joining the Wests Tigers in 2014 as an assistant coach.

Kidwell joined the New Zealand national rugby league team as an assistant coach in 2014. After Stephen Kearney left the role of being the head coach of the New Zealand national team in 2016, Kidwell was later appointed as the new Kiwis head coach,
Kidwell oversaw a brief but embarrassing era for New Zealand Rugby League in which they lost two World Cup matches to tier-2 nations, and fluked a draw against another in the 2016 Four Nations tournament.
A series of critical failures in team culture and management led to disappointing results and a mass exodus of players. One notable player to leave the team was Jason Taumololo. Taumololo defected to Tonga, who defeated New Zealand in a World Cup pool match.
Kidwell was replaced by Michael Maguire after failing to make the semi-finals of the 2017 World Cup.

In 2018, Kidwell was appointed as assistant coach at one of his former clubs The Parramatta Eels.

In May 2022 it was announced that Kidwell had been appointed defensive coach of the Argentina rugby union side, by head coach Michael Cheika.

Kiwis coaching record

References

External links 
Profile at melbournestorm.com.au
Profile at warringtonwolves.rivals.net
Freak injury ends Kidwell season
Profile at souths.com.au
Coaching Profile at rabbitohs.com.au

1977 births
Living people
Adelaide Rams players
Canterbury rugby league team players
Hornby Panthers players
Junior Kiwis players
Melbourne Storm players
Ngāti Whātua people
New Zealand Māori rugby league team coaches
New Zealand Māori rugby league team players
New Zealand national rugby league team coaches
New Zealand national rugby league team players
Expatriate sportspeople in England
New Zealand rugby league players
Parramatta Eels players
Rugby league centres
Rugby league second-rows
South Sydney Rabbitohs captains
South Sydney Rabbitohs players
Rugby league players from Christchurch
Sydney Roosters players
Warrington Wolves players